Grimlord is a fictitious villain character in the show VR Troopers.

Grimlord may also refer to:
 Grimlord (band), Polish heavy metal band.
 Grimlord Necrotis, a band member of Army of in Between
 David "Grimlord" Herrera, a band member of Bahimiron

See also
 Archibald Douglas, 3rd Earl of Douglas, known as Archibald the Grim
 Gremloids, alternative name for Hyperspace, a film written and directed by Todd Durham, and starring Chris Elliott and Paula Poundstone